Rhythm 'n Notes: Improve Your Music Skills (or Rhythm 'n Notes for short (TSUMAMI™ Rhythm 'n Notes in the UK), known in Japan as  is a music game published by Success in Japan, by Agetec in North America and by 505 Games (Tiger Aspect Productions for Windows/Mac) in Europe. It was released for Microsoft Windows and for Mac OS in 2006 and for Nintendo DS in 2007. Its focus is on rhythm for drums and tonal patterns for piano. The CD-ROM version was only released in the United Kingdom, because it is a part of the British Council. The main character, Tsumami, is your tour guide in this game (and has voice in CD-ROM version), and that character was registered by Tiger Aspect Productions in the United Kingdom. On November 30, 2011, the game was released in a Cartridge for VTech MobiGo.

Reception

The game received "generally unfavorable reviews" according to the review aggregation website Metacritic.

References

External links
Official site (Agetec)

2007 video games
Music video games
Keyboard video games
Drumming video games
Nintendo DS games
Nintendo DS-only games
Video games developed in Japan
505 Games games
Single-player video games
Agetec games